Minneapolis–Saint Paul is a metropolitan area in the Upper Midwestern United States centered around the confluence of the Mississippi, Minnesota and St. Croix rivers in the U.S. state of Minnesota. It is commonly known as the Twin Cities after the area's two largest cities, Minneapolis and Saint Paul. Minnesotans often refer to the two together (or the seven-county metro area collectively) simply as "the cities". It is Minnesota's economic, cultural, and political center.

Minneapolis and Saint Paul are independent municipalities with defined borders. Minneapolis sits mostly on the west side of the Mississippi River on lake-covered terrain. Although most of the city is residential neighborhoods, it has a business-dominated downtown area with some historic industrial areas, the Mill District and the Warehouse District. Minneapolis also has a popular uptown area. Saint Paul, which sits mostly on the east side of the river, has quaint tree-lined neighborhoods, a vast collection of well-preserved late-Victorian architecture, and a number of colleges. Both cities and the surrounding areas are known for their woods, lakes, hills and creeks. 

Originally inhabited by the Ojibwe and Dakota people, the cities were settled by various Europeans. Minneapolis was strongly influenced by early Scandinavian and Lutheran settlers, while Saint Paul was settled predominantly by the French, the Irish, and German Catholics. Today, both urban areas are home to new immigrant communities, including Somalis, Hmong, Oromo, Cameroonians, and Liberians.

"Twin Cities" is sometimes used to refer to the seven-county region governed by the Metropolitan Council regional governmental agency and planning organization. The United States Office of Management and Budget officially designates 15 counties as the "Minneapolis–St. Paul–Bloomington MN–WI Metropolitan Statistical Area". It is the 16th-largest metropolitan statistical area and third-largest metropolitan area in the Midwest, with a population of 3,690,261 at the 2020 census. The larger 21-county Minneapolis–St. Paul MN–WI Combined Statistical Area, which also ranks as the 16th-largest, had a population of 4,078,788 at the 2020 census.

History

European settlement 
Another settlement that fueled early interest in the area was the outpost at Fort Snelling, which was constructed from 1820 to 1825 at the confluence of the Minnesota River and the Mississippi River.

The Fort Snelling military reservation bordered both sides of the river up to Saint Anthony Falls. The town of Saint Anthony grew just outside the reservation on the river's east side. For several years, the only European resident to live on the west bank of the river was Colonel John H. Stevens, who operated a ferry service across the river. When the military reservation was reduced in size, settlers quickly moved to the land, creating the new village of Minneapolis. The town grew, with Minneapolis and Saint Anthony eventually merging. On the eastern side of the Mississippi, a few villages such as Pig's Eye and Lambert's Landing grew to become Saint Paul.

Nature 
Natural geography played a role in the two cities' settlement and development. The Mississippi River Valley in the area is defined by a series of stone bluffs that line the river. Saint Paul grew up around Lambert's Landing, the last place to unload boats coming upriver at an easily accessible point, seven miles (11 km) downstream from Saint Anthony Falls, the geographic feature that, due to the value of its immense water power for industry, defined Minneapolis's location and its prominence as the Mill City. The falls can be seen from the Mill City Museum, housed in the former Washburn "A" Mill, which was among the world's largest mills in its time. The phrase "St. Paul is the last city of the East, Minneapolis the first city of the West" alludes to the historical difference.

Farming 
The state's oldest farms are in Washington County. The county borders the St. Croix River and Wisconsin on the eastern side of the metropolitan area. Joseph Haskell was Minnesota's first white farmer, harvesting the first crops in the state in 1840 on what is now part of Afton Township on Trading Post Trail.

Grand Excursion 

The Grand Excursion, a trip into the Upper Midwest sponsored by the Rock Island Railroad, brought more than a thousand curious travelers into the area by rail and steamboat in 1854. In 1855, Henry Wadsworth Longfellow published The Song of Hiawatha, an epic poem based on the Ojibwe legends of Hiawatha. A number of natural area landmarks appear in the story, including Lake Minnetonka and Minnehaha Falls. Tourists inspired by the coverage of the Grand Excursion in eastern newspapers and those who read The Song of Hiawatha flocked to the area in the following decades.

Rail transport 
At one time, the region also had numerous passenger rail services, including both interurban streetcar systems and interstate rail. Due to the river's width at points further south, the Minneapolis–Saint Paul area was briefly one of the few places where the Mississippi could be crossed by railroad. Much commercial rail traffic also ran through the area, often carrying grain to be processed at Minneapolis mills or delivering other goods to Saint Paul to be transported along the Mississippi. Saint Paul was long at the head of navigation on the river, until a lock and dam facility was added upriver in Minneapolis.

Passenger travel hit its peak in 1888, with nearly eight million traversing to and from Saint Paul Union Depot. This amounted to approximately 150 trains daily. Soon, other rail crossings were built farther south and travel through the region began to decline. In an effort by the rail companies to combat the rise of the automobile, some of the earliest streamliners ran from Chicago to Minneapolis/Saint Paul and eventually served distant points in the Pacific Northwest. Today, the only vestige of this interstate service is Amtrak's Seattle/Portland to Chicago Empire Builder route, running once daily in each direction. It is named after James J. Hill, a railroad tycoon who settled on Summit Avenue in Saint Paul in what is now known as the James J. Hill House.

Socioeconomic history 
Like many Northern cities that grew up with the Industrial Revolution, Minneapolis and St. Paul experienced shifts in their economic base as heavy industry declined, especially in the 1960s and 1970s. With the economic decline of those decades came population decline in the central city areas, white flight to suburbs, and, in the summer of 1967, race riots on Minneapolis's North Side. But by the 1980s and 1990s, Minneapolis and Saint Paul were often cited as former Rust Belt cities that had made successful transitions to service, high-technology, finance, and information economies.

In May and June 2020, the Minneapolis–Saint Paul metropolitan area became a focus of international attention after MPD officer Derek Chauvin murdered George Floyd by kneeling on his neck for almost ten minutes. The murder sparked local, nationwide and international protests against racism and police brutality, bringing considerable attention to the MPD. Minneapolis–Saint Paul was the site of the second-costliest act of civil disobedience in U.S. history, after the 1992 Los Angeles Riots. Local protests and riots caused an estimated $550 million in damages and affected around 1,600 businesses.

Rivalry
Minneapolis and Saint Paul have competed since they were founded, resulting in some duplication of effort. After Saint Paul completed its elaborate cathedral in 1915, Minneapolis followed up with the equally ornate Basilica of St. Mary in 1926. In the late 19th and early 20th centuries, the rivalry became so intense that an architect practicing in one city was often refused business in the other. The 1890 United States Census even led to the two cities arresting and/or kidnapping each other's census takers, in an attempt to keep each city from outgrowing the other.

The rivalry occasionally erupted into inter-city violence, as at a 1929 game between the Minneapolis Millers and the St. Paul Saints, both baseball teams of the American Association. In the 1950s, both cities competed for a major league baseball franchise (which resulted in two rival stadiums being built), and there was a brief period in the mid-1960s when the two cities could not agree on a common calendar for daylight saving time, resulting in a few weeks when people in Minneapolis were one hour "behind" those in Saint Paul.

The cities' mutual antagonism was largely healed by the end of the 1960s, aided by the simultaneous arrival in 1961 of the Minnesota Twins of the American League and the Minnesota Vikings of the National Football League, both of which identified themselves with the state as a whole (the former explicitly named for both Twin Cities) rather than either city (like the earlier Minneapolis Lakers). Since 1961, it has been common practice for any major sports team based in the Twin Cities to be named for Minnesota as a whole. In terms of development, the two cities remain distinct in their progress, with Minneapolis absorbing new and avant-garde architecture while Saint Paul continues to carefully integrate new buildings into the context of classical and Victorian styles.

Geography and geology

Like much of Minnesota, the Twin Cities area was shaped by water and ice over millions of years. The area's land sits atop thick layers of sandstone and limestone laid down as seas encroached upon and receded from the region. Erosion caused natural caves to develop, which were expanded into mines when white settlers came to the area. During Prohibition, at least one speakeasy was built into these hidden spaces—eventually refurbished as Saint Paul's Wabasha Street Caves.

Lakes across the area were formed and altered by the movement of glaciers. This left many bodies of water in the region, some with unusual shapes. For example, Lake Minnetonka, toward the western side of the Twin Cities, consists of a complex arrangement of channels and large bays.

Because it is relatively easy to dig through limestone and there are many natural and manmade open spaces, it has often been proposed that the area should consider building subways for public transportation. That could be less expensive in the Twin Cities than in many other places, but would still be much more expensive than surface projects.

Climate

Owing to their northerly latitude and inland location, the Twin Cities experience the coldest climate of any major metropolitan area in the United States. But due to their southern location in the state and the urban heat island, the Twin Cities are among Minnesota's warmest places.

Temperatures above  occur an average of 15 times per year. High temperatures above  have been common in recent years; the last was on July 6, 2012. Recent records include  at Vadnais Lake on February 2, 1996 (National Climatic Data Center)

The Twin Cities area takes the brunt of many types of extreme weather, including high-speed straight-line winds, tornadoes, flash floods, drought, heat, bitter cold, and blizzards. The costliest weather disaster in Twin Cities history was a derecho event on May 15, 1998. Hail and wind damage exceeded $950 million, much of it in the Twin Cities. Other memorable Twin Cities weather-related events include the tornado outbreak on May 6, 1965, the Armistice Day Blizzard on November 11, 1940, and the Halloween Blizzard of 1991. These temperatures are colder than those found on the surface of Mars. (See: Department of Natural Resources - Cold Outbreak: January 27-31, 2019)

A normal growing season in the metro extends from late April or early May through the month of October. The USDA places the area in the 4a plant hardiness zone.

Communities

Metropolitan Statistical Area

The Minneapolis–St. Paul–Bloomington MN–WI Metropolitan Statistical Area, or Twin Cities, includes 15 counties, of which 13 are in Minnesota and two in Wisconsin. The Minnesota portion accounts for almost two-thirds of Minnesota's population.

Note: Counties that are bolded are under jurisdiction of the Metropolitan Council. Counties that are italicized were added to the metropolitan area when the Office of Management and Budget revised its delineations of metropolitan statistical areas in 2013. Sibley County was included in the metropolitan statistical area from 2013 to September 2018.

Combined Statistical Area

The Minneapolis–St. Paul, MN–WI Combined Statistical Area is made up of 19 counties in Minnesota and two counties in Wisconsin. The statistical area includes two metropolitan areas and four micropolitan areas. As of the 2010 census, the CSA had a population of 3,682,928 (though a July 1, 2012 estimate placed it at 3,691,918). In 2013, the Owatonna Micropolitan Statistical Area was added.

Note: Owatonna MSA was not part of CSA in 2010.

Cities and suburbs
There are approximately 218 incorporated municipalities in the Twin Cities metropolitan region. This includes census-designated places and villages in Wisconsin, but excludes unincorporated towns in Wisconsin, known as civil townships in other states. Population numbers are from the 2020 census.

Principal cities 
 Minneapolis (429,954)
 Saint Paul (311,527)

Places with 50,000 to 99,999 inhabitants

 Bloomington (89,987)
 Brooklyn Park (86,478)
 Plymouth (81,026)
 Woodbury (75,102)
 Maple Grove (70,253)
 Blaine (70,222)
 Lakeville (69,490)
 Eagan (68,855)
 Burnsville (64,317)
 Eden Prairie (64,198)
 Coon Rapids (63,599)
 Apple Valley (56,374)
 Minnetonka (53,781)
 Edina (53,494)
 St. Louis Park (50,010)

Places with 25,000 to 49,999 inhabitants

 Shakopee (43,698)
 Maplewood (42,088)
 Cottage Grove (38,839)
 Richfield (36,994)
 Roseville (36,254)
 Inver Grove Heights (35,801)
 Brooklyn Center (33,782)
 Andover (32,601)
 Savage (32,465)
 Fridley (29,590)
 Oakdale (28,303)
 Chaska (27,810)
 Ramsey (27,646)
 Prior Lake (27,617)
 Shoreview (26,921)
 Chanhassen (25,947)
 Elk River (25,835)
 Rosemount (25,650)

Places with 10,000 to 24,999 inhabitants

 White Bear Lake (24,883)
 Champlin (23,919)
 Farmington (23,632)
 New Brighton (23,454)
 Crystal (23,330)
 Golden Valley (22,552)
 Hastings (22,154)
 New Hope (21,986)
 Columbia Heights (21,973)
 Lino Lakes (21,399)
 South St. Paul (20,759)
 West St. Paul (20,615)
 Forest Lake (20,611)
 Otsego (19,956)
 Stillwater (19,394)
 Hopkins (19,079)
 St. Michael (18,235)
 Anoka (17,921)
 Ham Lake (16,464)
 River Falls, Wisconsin (16,182)
 Buffalo (16,168)
 Hugo (15,766)
 Hudson, Wisconsin (14,755)
 Robbinsdale (14,646)
 Monticello (14,455)
 Rogers (13,295)
 Mounds View (13,249)
 Waconia (13,033)
 Vadnais Heights (12,912)
 North St. Paul (12,364)
 East Bethel (11,786)
 Mendota Heights (11,744)
 Big Lake (11,686)
 Lake Elmo (11,335)
 Little Canada (10,819)
 North Branch (10,787)
 Victoria (10,546)

Places with fewer than 10,000 inhabitants 
 Arden Hills (9,939)
 Cambridge (9,611)
 Mound (9,398)
 St. Anthony (9,257)
 Oak Grove (8,929)
 Orono (8,315)
 Minnetrista (8,262)
 New Prague (8,162)
 Saint Francis (8,142)
 Mahtomedi (8,138)
 Wyoming (8,032)
 Albertville (7,896)
 Shorewood (7,783)
 Belle Plaine (7,395)
 Dayton (7,262)
 Spring Lake Park (7,188)
 Medina (6,837)
 Isanti (6,804)
 Jordan (6,656)
 Delano (6,484)
 Zimmerman (6,189)
 Corcoran (6,185)
 Carver (5,839)
 Chisago City (5,558)
 Saint Paul Park (5,544)
 Falcon Heights (5,369)
 North Oaks (5,272)
 Circle Pines (5,025)
 Lindstrom (4,888)
 Becker (4,877)
 Oak Park Heights (4,849)
 Elko New Market (4,846)
 Princeton (4,819)
 Lonsdale (4,686)
 Watertown (4,659)
 Nowthen (4,536)
 Rockford (4,500)
 Wayzata (4,434)
 Prescott, Wisconsin (4,258)
 Le Sueur (4,213)
 Columbus (4,159)
 Bayport (4,024)
 Scandia (3,984)
 Grant (3,966)
 Deephaven (3,899)
 Centerville (3,896)
 Norwood Young America (3,863)
 Newport (3,797)
 Montrose (3,775)
 Independence (3,755)
 Hanover (3,548)
 Annandale (3,330)
 Montgomery (3,249)
 Rush City (3,072)
 Afton (2,955)
 Greenfield (2,923)
 Milaca (2,901)
 Cokato (2,799)
 Osseo (2,688)
 Le Center (2,517)
 Mayer (2,453)
 Excelsior (2,355)
 St. Bonifacius (2,307)
 Lauderdale (2,271)
 Lexington (2,248)
 Maple Lake (2,159)
 Howard Lake (2,071)
 Cologne (2,047)
 Clearwater (1,855)
 Waterville (1,849)
 Braham (1,820)
 Maple Plain (1,743)
 Long Lake (1,741)
 Spring Park (1,734)
 Lakeland (1,710)
 Stacy (1,470)
 Tonka Bay (1,442)
 Waverly (1,410)
 Dellwood (1,171)
 Shafer (1,142)
 Harris (1,111)
 Taylors Falls (1,055)
 Lake St. Croix Beach (1,043)
 Vineland (1,001)
 Hilltop (958)
 Onamia (878)
 Birchwood Village (863)
 Landfall (843)
 Lilydale (809)
 Loretto (762)
 Isle (751)
 Greenwood (726)
 Kasota (718)
 Cleveland (700)
 Hampton (687)
 Center City (672)
 Marine on St. Croix (664)
 Elysian (650)
 Clear Lake (573)
 Gem Lake (567)
 Hamburg (566)
 Foreston (559)
 Minnetonka Beach (546)
 Sunfish Lake (522)
 Willernie (515)
 Bethel (476)
 Randolph (466)
 New Germany (464)
 Vermillion (441)
 Woodland (439)
 Pine Springs (377)
 Lakeland Shores (339)
 Medicine Lake (337)
 St. Marys Point (321)
 Wahkon (256)
 Pease (248)
 South Haven (192)
 Mendota (157)
 Kilkenny (148)
 Coates (147)
 Miesville (138)
 Heidelberg (137)
 Bock (104)
 New Trier (86)

Culture

Fine and performing arts

The Minneapolis–Saint Paul metropolitan area fine art museums include the Minneapolis Institute of Art, the Walker Art Center, the Frederick R. Weisman Art Museum, Minnesota Museum of American Art and The Museum of Russian Art. Other museums include American Swedish Institute, Science Museum of Minnesota, Minnesota Children's Museum, Bell Museum (natural history and planetarium) and The Bakken Museum (science and technology). The Minnesota Orchestra and the Saint Paul Chamber Orchestra are full-time professional musical ensembles. The Guthrie Theater is a world-class regional theater overlooking the Mississippi River. The Minnesota Fringe Festival is an annual celebration of theatre, dance, improvisation, puppetry, kids' shows, visual art, and musicals.

The Twin Cities is also the home of Minnesota Public Radio (MPR), the nation's second-largest public radio station. It has both a classical station and a contemporary station, The Current, which plays music from regional and other contemporary artists. The MPR program A Prairie Home Companion, hosted by Minnesota native Garrison Keillor, aired live for many years from the Fitzgerald Theater in Saint Paul. The show ended its run in 2016, with its successor Live from Here also airing from the same venue. This radio program was the basis of the 2006 film A Prairie Home Companion.

The Brave New Workshop Comedy Theater is a sketch and improvisational comedy theater in Minneapolis. It is the nation's oldest comedy theater.

The Current and the Walker Art Center also host the annual music festival Rock the Garden, which features nationally recognized and local artists. The festival has been held annually since 2008 and has featured artists such as Lizzo, Hippo Campus, Chance the Rapper, Bon Iver, The Flaming Lips, Wilco and Sonic Youth.

The Basilica of Saint Mary in Minneapolis hosts the annual Basilica Block Party, another music festival, which has featured nationally recognized artists such as Weezer, Andy Grammer, Death Cab for Cutie and Panic! at the Disco. The festival is used as a fundraiser for the restoration of the basilica. The event draws about 25,000 people to the downtown area.

The Twin Cities area also has a number of venues where artists come to perform. Minneapolis is home to First Avenue. First Avenue is known for being the starting venue for many famous artists and bands from the area, including Prince, The Replacements, Atmosphere, and Manny Phesto. It became one of the most recognizable venues in Minnesota after the release of the Prince movie Purple Rain, in which it is featured.

Outdoors

There are numerous lakes in the region, and some cities in the area have extensive park systems for recreation. Organized recreation includes the Great River Energy bicycle festival, the Twin Cities Marathon, and the U.S. pond hockey championships. Some studies have shown that area residents take advantage of this, and are among the most physically fit in the country, but others have disputed that. Medicine is a major industry in the region and the southeasterly city of Rochester, as the University of Minnesota has joined other colleges and hospitals in doing significant research, and major medical device manufacturers started in the region (the most prominent is Medtronic). Technical innovators have brought important advances in computing, including the Cray line of supercomputers.

Many Twin Cities residents own or share cabins and other properties along lakes and forested areas in central and northern Minnesota, and weekend trips "up North" happen in the warmer months. Ice fishing is a major winter pastime, although overambitious fishers sometimes find themselves in danger when they venture onto the ice too early or too late. Hunting, snowmobiling, ATV riding and other outdoor activities are also popular. This connection to the outdoors also brings a strong sense of environmentalism to many Minnesotans.

In 2011 and 2012, the American College of Sports Medicine named Minneapolis–Saint Paul the nation's healthiest metropolitan area.

Sports

The Twin Cities is one of 13 American metropolitan areas with teams in all four major professional sports—baseball (MLB), football (NFL), basketball (NBA) and ice hockey (NHL). Including Major League Soccer, it is one of 11 metro areas with five major professional sports teams. To avoid favoring either city, most teams based in the area use only the word "Minnesota" in their names, rather than "Minneapolis" or "St. Paul".

Minneapolis was the site of two Super Bowls—Super Bowl XXVI in 1992 and Super Bowl LII in 2018. It is the farthest north that a Super Bowl has ever been played. The Minnesota Vikings have played in four Super Bowls—IV in 1970, VIII in 1974, IX in 1975 and XI in 1977.

The World Series has been played in the Twin Cities three times—1965, 1987 and 1991—as have three Major League Baseball All-Star Games—1965, 1985 and 2014. NHL All-Star games were hosted in 1972 and 2004, NBA All-Star game in 1994, WNBA All-Star game in 2018 and MLS All-Star game in 2022.

The Stanley Cup Finals have been played in the Twin Cities twice, in 1981 and 1991. The NHL Stadium Series had a game in the Twin Cities in 2016.

The Final Four Men's National College Athletics Association (NCAA) basketball tournament has been hosted by Minneapolis four times—1951, 1992, 2001 and 2019—and the Women's twice, in 1995 and 2022.

The Frozen Four Men's NCAA hockey tournament has been hosted by the Twin Cities eight times—1958, 1966, 1989, 1991, 1994, 2002, 2011 and 2018. It is scheduled to return in 2024.

Major golf tournaments hosted in the Twin Cities include: U.S. Open—1916, 1930, 1970, 1991; U.S. Women's Open—1966, 1977, 2008; PGA Championship—1932, 1954, 2002, 2009; Women's PGA Championship, 2019; Walker Cup, 1957; Solheim Cup, 2002; and the Ryder Cup, 2016. The Ryder Cup is scheduled to return in 2028.

The 1998 World Figure Skating Championships were held at the Target Center in Minneapolis.

The 2017, 2018 and 2019 X Games were held in Minneapolis. The 2020 X Games were canceled due to the COVID-19 pandemic.

The Twin Cities host three nationally competing Roller Derby leagues: the Minnesota Roller Derby of the Women's Flat Track Derby Association Division 1, the North Star Roller Derby of WFTDA Division 2, and Minnesota Men's Roller Derby, a league of the Men's Roller Derby Association. MNRD and NSRD have four home teams each: the Dagger Dolls, Garda Belts, Rockits, and Atomic Bombshells of MNRD and the Banger Sisters, Delta Delta Di, Kilmores, and Violent Femmes of NSRD, as well as two traveling teams each. MMRD has three home teams: The Gentlemen's Club, Destruction Workers, and Thunderjacks, and two traveling teams.

The annual Twin Cities Marathon is held in the fall with a course running through Minneapolis and Saint Paul. Minneapolis was the birthplace of Rollerblade and is a center for inline skating, as well as home to the most golfers per capita of any U.S. city.

Some other sports teams gained their names from being in Minnesota before relocating. The Los Angeles Lakers get their name from once being based in Minneapolis, the City of Lakes. The Dallas Stars also derived their name from their tenure as a Minnesota team, the Minnesota North Stars.

Professional sports teams in Minneapolis–Saint Paul

The Twin Cities are also home of the University of Minnesota Golden Gophers who play in the Big Ten Conference.

Media

Print
The Twin Cities have two major daily newspapers: the Star Tribune and the Saint Paul Pioneer Press. The Minnesota Daily serves the University of Minnesota's Twin Cities campus and surrounding neighborhoods. There is one general-interest neighborhood weekly newspaper still in the cities: The East Side Review, devoted to the 90,000 residents in St. Paul's eastern third. Other weekly papers are devoted to specific audiences/demographics, including (until 2020) City Pages.

Television

The region is the 15th-largest television market, according to Nielsen Media Research. Three duopolies exist in the Twin Cities: Twin Cities PBS operates KTCA and KTCI, Hubbard Broadcasting (built by Stanley E. Hubbard) owns ABC affiliate KSTP-TV and independent station KSTC-TV, and Fox Television Stations operates Fox owned-and-operated station KMSP-TV and MyNetworkTV O&O WFTC. Diversified from radio, KSTP-TV became the first TV channel to air in the region with a show reaching 3,000 sets in 1948, and the 17th station to broadcast in the U.S.

The only station with its main studios in Minneapolis is CBS O&O WCCO, while Saint Paul hosts KSTP/KSTC, KTCA/KTCI, and CW affiliate WUCW. NBC affiliate KARE has a broadcasting complex in suburban Golden Valley. KMSP is in suburban Eden Prairie. For much of the last two decades, WCCO and KARE have shared in having the most popular evening newscasts in the area. On the other end, KSTP has struggled to maintain ratings on its news programs. KMSP has had a 9 o'clock newscast since at least the early 1990s, when it was an independent channel.

Communities in the region have their own public, educational, and government access (PEG) cable television channels. One, the Metro Cable Network, is available on channel 6 on cable systems across the seven-county region.

Several television programs originating in the Twin Cities have aired nationally on terrestrial and cable TV networks. KTCA created the science program Newton's Apple and distributes a children's program today. A few unusual comedic shows also originated in the area. In the 1980s, KTMA (predecessor to WUCW) created a number of low-budget shows, including cult classic Mystery Science Theater 3000. The short-lived Let's Bowl started on KARE, and PBS series Mental Engineering originated on the Saint Paul cable access network.

Radio
The Twin Cities radio market was ranked 15th by Nielsen in 2018. In November 2018, the area's top five morning radio shows were all FM stations: KSTP, KXFN, KQQL, KDWB, and KXXR. Three of those stations are owned by iHeartRadio. Most stations broadcast on air and online, as livestreams from their websites.

KSTP, a television station, also has radio stations, with pop music format on FM and ESPN Radio on AM. KSTP-AM and FM are owned by Hubbard Broadcasting. In 1985, Hubbard—valued at $400 million—was one of the nation's larger corporate media companies; in 2005, valued at $1.2 billion, Hubbard was a fairly small major-market media operation.

The Twin Cities have a mix of commercial and non-commercial radio stations. The city's market is dominated by iHeartRadio, which operates seven stations. Two small, independent stations are award winners—KUOM, operated by the University of Minnesota, and KFAI public access radio in Cedar Riverside.

Minnesota Public Radio (MPR) airs on KNOW 91.1 FM, KSJN 91.5 FM and KCMP 89.3 FM, with separate programs on each station. It was first nationally known for the variety show A Prairie Home Companion, which ceased production in 2016. Doing business under the name American Public Media, the company is the second largest producer of NPR content, after National Public Radio (of which MPR is an affiliate). KCMP is also known as The Current.

Independent media
The Twin Cities is home to many independent media organizations, including The UpTake and MinnPost.

Demographics

Population

Place of birth
About 93% of the metropolitan area's population is native to the United States, including 0.6% born in Puerto Rico, a U.S. territory, or abroad to American parents. The rest of the population is foreign-born.

The highest percentages of immigrants came from Asia (38.2%), Latin America (25.4%), and Africa (20.1%); smaller percentages of newcomers came from Europe (13.1%), other parts of North America (3.0%), and Oceania (0.2%).

Religion

Minneapolis–Saint Paul is a major center for religion in the state, especially Christianity. The state headquarters of five major Christian churches are there: the Roman Catholic Archdiocese of Saint Paul and Minneapolis, the Episcopal Diocese of Minnesota, the Presbyterian Synod of Lakes and Prairies, and the Church of Jesus Christ of Latter-day Saints (LDS Church). The Presbyterian and LDS churches both have missions in Saint Paul, Minneapolis, and Bloomington, as does the Orthodox Church in America.

The headquarters of the former American Lutheran Church (ALC), Evangelical Lutheran Church, Lutheran Free Church and the Augustana Evangelical Lutheran Church were in Minneapolis; the headquarters of Augsburg Fortress publishing house still is. The Minneapolis Area Synod and the Saint Paul Area Synod are the largest and third-largest synods of the Evangelical Lutheran Church in America (ELCA), respectively.

The Evangelical Free Church of America is headquartered in Bloomington, and the Association of Free Lutheran Congregations is headquartered in Plymouth, along with its seminary and a Bible School.

The Twin Cities are home to a Jewish population of approximately 64,800, with about 31% of Jewish households in Minneapolis suburbs, 24% in Minneapolis, 16% in St. Paul, 14% in the St. Paul suburbs, and 15% in outer suburbs. There is also a Hindu temple in the Twin Cities suburb of Maple Grove. The Twin Cities' sole Sikh gurdwara is in Bloomington. A recent influx of immigrants from Laos and Northern Africa has brought many more religions to the area. There are several Islamic Masjids in the area. There is a temple for the religion of Eckankar in the suburb of Chanhassen known as the Temple of Eck. In addition, many Hmong and Tibetan Buddhist peoples live in Saint Paul; a Hmong Buddhist temple opened in suburban Roseville in 1995. The LDS St. Paul Minnesota Temple opened in Oakdale, a suburb east of Saint Paul, in 2000. There are several Unitarian Universalist communities, such as the First Unitarian Society of Minneapolis, as well as several Pagan and Buddhist groups. Minneapolis–Saint Paul has been called Paganistan due to the large numbers of Pagans living there. An estimated 20,000 Pagans live in the area.

Minneapolis is where the Billy Graham Evangelistic Association started and was its home for more than 50 years.

Politics
The 2008 Republican National Convention was held at the Xcel Energy Center in Saint Paul. Minneapolis and Saint Paul had submitted combined bids to host the 2008 Democratic National Convention and the Republican National Convention. Minneapolis hosted the 1892 Republican National Convention.

Like most major metropolitan areas, the Twin Cities is a stronghold for the Democratic Party, known in Minnesota as the Democratic-Farmer-Labor Party. At the state level, DFLers in the Minnesota legislature have increasingly relied on the Twin Cities to build majorities. Outside of the staunchly liberal urban core, the suburbs of the Twin Cities have been historically competitive for both the DFL and the Republicans.

Economy

The Minneapolis–Saint Paul area is home to 24 Fortune 1000 headquarters. The 2022 rankings are:

Private companies headquartered in the Twin Cities area include Cargill, the country's largest private company, Carlson, Radisson Hotel Group, Holiday Stationstores, and Andersen. Foreign companies with U.S. headquarters in the Twin Cities include Aimia, Allianz Life, Canadian Pacific, Coloplast, Medtronic, Pearson VUE and Pentair.

The Twin Cities' economy is the nation's 13th-largest and ranks second in the Midwest after Chicago. The Minneapolis–Saint Paul area is also North America's second-largest medical device manufacturing center and the fourth-largest U.S. banking center, based on total assets of banks headquartered in the area, after New York, San Francisco, and Charlotte.

The Federal Reserve Bank of Minneapolis covers the 9th District of the Federal Reserve System, which is made up of Minnesota, Montana, North and South Dakota, northwestern Wisconsin, and the Upper Peninsula of Michigan. Its geographical territory is the third-largest of the 12 Federal Reserve banks.

Education

Colleges and universities

 Adler Graduate School – Minnetonka
 Anoka-Ramsey Community College – Coon Rapids and Cambridge
 Anoka Technical College – Anoka
 Augsburg University – Minneapolis
 Bethany Global University - Bloomington
 Bethel University – Arden Hills
 Capella University – Minneapolis
 Century College – White Bear Lake
 Concordia University – Saint Paul
 Crown College – St. Bonifacius
 Dakota County Technical College – Rosemount
 Dunwoody College of Technology – Minneapolis
 Hamline University – Saint Paul
 Hennepin Technical College – Eden Prairie and Brooklyn Park
 Inver Hills Community College – Inver Grove Heights
 Luther Seminary – Saint Paul
 Macalester College – Saint Paul
 Metropolitan State University – Saint Paul and Minneapolis
 Minneapolis College of Art and Design – Minneapolis
 Minneapolis Community and Technical College – Minneapolis
 Minnesota State University – Edina
 Mitchell Hamline School of Law – Saint Paul
 Normandale Community College – Bloomington
 North Central University – Minneapolis
 North Hennepin Community College – Brooklyn Park
 Northwestern Health Sciences University – Bloomington
 Rasmussen University – Bloomington, Blaine, Brooklyn Park, Eagan and Lake Elmo
 St. Catherine University – Saint Paul and Minneapolis
 St. Cloud State University – St. Cloud and Maple Grove
 St. Mary's University of Minnesota – Minneapolis
 Saint Paul College – Saint Paul
 United Theological Seminary – Saint Paul
 University of Minnesota – Minneapolis and Saint Paul (Falcon Heights)
 University of Northwestern – St. Paul – Roseville
 University of St. Thomas – Saint Paul and Minneapolis
 University of Wisconsin – River Falls and Hudson
 Walden University – Minneapolis

Libraries

Libraries, with numbers of branches

 Anoka County Library - 9
 Bayport Public Library - 1
 Carver County Library - 6
 Dakota County Library - 10
 Hennepin County Library - 41
 Ramsey County Library - 7
 St. Paul Public Library - 13
 Scott County Library - 7
 Stillwater Public Library - 1
 Washington County Library - 7

Infrastructure

Buildings and structures

The 11 tallest buildings and 16 of the 17 tallest buildings in the area are in downtown Minneapolis. There is some dispute over which building is the tallest—most Minnesotans think of the IDS Center if asked, but most sources seem to agree that Capella Tower is slightly taller. Capella Tower and the Wells Fargo Center differ in height by a foot or two.

Buildings have gone up and been torn down rapidly across the region. Some city blocks have been demolished six or seven times since the mid-19th century. No single architectural style dominates the region. The cities have a mishmash of different designs, although structures from a few eras stand out. There were once many stone buildings in the Richardsonian Romanesque style (or at least Romanesque-inspired variants). Minneapolis City Hall is one prominent example of this, though buildings of all types—including personal residences such as the James J. Hill House—were similarly designed. A few decades later, Art Deco brought several structures that survive today, including St. Paul City Hall, the Foshay Tower, and the Minneapolis Post Office. The style of buildings in the two cities varies greatly. In Minneapolis, the trend has been toward sleek lines and modern glass facades, while Saint Paul tends to follow a more traditional style to better accompany its older structures.

Saint Paul and especially Minneapolis underwent massive urban renewal projects in the post-World War II era, so a vast number of buildings are now lost to history. Some of the larger and harder to demolish structures have survived. In fact, the area might be signified more by bridges than buildings. A series of reinforced concrete arch spans crossing the Mississippi River were built in the 1920s and 1930s. They still carry daily traffic. A number have undergone major repair work, but retain the original design. Several are listed on the National Register of Historic Places, including the 10th Avenue Bridge, Intercity Bridge (Ford Parkway), Robert Street Bridge, and the longest, the  Mendota Bridge. The area is also noted for having the first known permanent crossing of the Mississippi. That structure is long gone, but a series of Hennepin Avenue Bridges have since been built at the site. Both downtowns have extensive networks of enclosed pedestrian bridges known as skyways.

Several prominent Minneapolis buildings helped modernize the city. These include the Walker Art Center, Central Public Library, Weisman Art Museum and the Guthrie Theater. Opening in April 2005, the new Walker Art Center, nearly double its former size, includes increased indoor and outdoor facilities. The Walker is recognized internationally as a singular model of a multidisciplinary arts organization and a national leader for its innovative approaches to audience engagement. The Guthrie received a large amount of media coverage for its opening in June 2006. It was designed by Jean Nouvel and is a  facility that houses three theaters: the theater's signature thrust stage, seating 1,100; a 700-seat proscenium stage; and a black-box studio with flexible seating. In 2002, the National Trust for Historic Preservation put the old Guthrie building on its list of the most endangered historic properties in the U.S. in response to plans the Walker announced to expand on the land occupied by the theater. The original Guthrie building was torn down in 2006.

Healthcare

Hospitals with Numbers of Beds

Trauma Centers - Level I * ;  Level II **

Allina Health 
 Abbott Northwestern Hospital - Minneapolis - 686
 Mercy Hospital - Coon Rapids - 271 **
 Mercy Hospital (Unity Campus) - Fridley - 164
 Phillips Eye Institute - Minneapolis - 8
 Regina Hospital - Hastings - 43
 United Hospital - St. Paul - 556

Children's Minnesota - 381
 Children's Minnesota Hospital - Minneapolis 
 Children's Minnesota Hospital - St. Paul

Gillette Children's Specialty Healthcare
 Gillette Children's Hospital - St. Paul - 60

HealthPartners
 Lakeview Hospital - Stillwater - 90
 Methodist Hospital - St. Louis Park - 361
 Regions Hospital - St. Paul - 452 *
 St. Francis Regional Medical Center - Shakopee - 89

Hennepin Healthcare
 Hennepin County Medical Center - Minneapolis - 484 *

M Health Fairview
 Bethesda Hospital - (long term acute) - St. Paul - 50
 M Health Fairview Lakes Medical Center - Wyoming - 61
 M Health Fairview Ridges Hospital - Burnsville - 171
 M Health Fairview Southdale Hospital - Edina - 334
 M Health Fairview University of Minnesota Medical Center - Minneapolis - 828 **
 M Health Fairview University of Minnesota Masonic Children's Hospital - Minneapolis - 212
 St. John's Hospital - Maplewood - 184
 St. Joseph's Hospital - St. Paul - 253
 M Health Fairview Woodwinds Hospital - Woodbury - 86

North Memorial Health
 Maple Grove Hospital - Maple Grove - 130
 North Memorial Health Hospital - Robbinsdale - 353 *

Ridgeview Health
 Ridgeview Medical Center - Waconia - 124

Veterans Administration Health Care
 Veterans Administration Medical Center - Minneapolis - 845

Transportation

Roads and highways

In the 20th century, the Twin Cities area expanded outward significantly. Automobiles made it possible for suburbs to grow greatly. The area now has a number of freeways, and many traffic cameras and ramp meters to monitor and manage traffic congestion. There is some use of HOV (high-occupancy vehicle) express lanes, which is becoming more common. To use an express lane, a driver must have a MnPASS transponder or at least one passenger. MnPASS rates are determined by the amount of traffic on the road and/or the time of day. During non-peak times, the MnPASS express lanes, except those on Interstate 394 (I-394) between Minnesota Highway 100 (MN 100) and I-94, are open to all traffic.

I-94 comes into the area from the east and heads northwest from Minneapolis. Two spur routes form the I-494/I-694 loop, and I-394 continues west when I-94 turns north. I-35 splits in Burnsville in the southern part of the region, bringing I-35E into Saint Paul and I-35W into Minneapolis. They rejoin to the north in Columbus (just south of Forest Lake) and continue to the highway's terminus in Duluth. This is one of only two examples of an interstate highway splitting into branches and then rejoining; the other is in Dallas–Fort Worth, where I-35 also splits into east and west branches.

On August 1, 2007, much of the I-35W Mississippi River bridge near downtown Minneapolis collapsed into the Mississippi River around 6:05pm CDT. A replacement bridge opened on September 18, 2008.

 Interstates

  I-35
  I-35E
  I-35W
  I-94
  I-394
  I-494
  I-694

 U.S. Highways

  US 10
  US 12
  US 52 (Lafayette Freeway)
  US 61 (Blues Highway)
  US 169 (Johnson Memorial Highway)
  US 212 (Minnesota Veterans Memorial Highway)

 Major state highways

  MN 3
  MN 5 
  MN 7
  MN 13
  MN 36
  MN 47
  MN 51 (Snelling Avenue North)
  MN 55 (Olson Memorial Highway)
  MN 62 (Crosstown Highway)
  MN 65
  MN 77 (Cedar Avenue)
  MN 100
  MN 101
  MN 120
  MN 149
  MN 252
  MN 156
  MN 280
  MN 610

Air travel
The main airport in the region is Minneapolis–Saint Paul International Airport (MSP), a major hub for Delta Air Lines. The airport is also the main hub and operating base for Sun Country Airlines. There are six smaller (relief) airports in the area owned and operated by the Metropolitan Airports Commission (the same agency operates MSP). Some people commute by air to the Twin Cities from northern Minnesota.

Relief airports in the metropolitan area are:

 Airlake Airport (LVN) – Lakeville
 Anoka County-Blaine Airport (ANE) – Blaine
 Crystal Airport (MIC) – Crystal
 Flying Cloud Airport (FCM) – Eden Prairie
 Lake Elmo Airport (21D) – Lake Elmo
 St. Paul Downtown Airport (STP) – St. Paul

Public transit

Metro Transit, by far the area's biggest bus service provider, owes its existence to the old streetcar lines in the area. Metro Transit provides about 95% of the public transit rides in the region, with over 900 buses, while some suburbs have other bus services. The University of Minnesota, Twin Cities operates a free bus system between its campuses. This system includes the Campus Connector bus rapid transit line, which travels between the Minneapolis and Saint Paul campuses by a dedicated bus line and throughout the two campuses on normal access roads. The METRO Blue Line LRT (light rail) began operations in June 2004, connecting downtown Minneapolis, Minneapolis–Saint Paul International Airport and the Mall of America in Bloomington. It was followed by the METRO Red Line BRT (bus rapid transitway) in 2013 connecting the Mall of America with Lakeville along Cedar Avenue through the southern suburbs. The METRO Green Line LRT connecting downtown Minneapolis, the University of Minnesota campus and downtown Saint Paul along University Avenue opened in 2014. Metro Transit operates all three lines. The Northstar Line commuter rail line connecting Minneapolis with Big Lake opened in 2009.

The METRO system consists of six separate projects. There are two light rail lines: the Blue Line, which runs from Target Field in downtown Minneapolis past Minneapolis-St Paul International Airport to the Mall of America; and the Green Line, which runs from Target Field past the University of Minnesota to Union Depot in downtown Saint Paul. The BRT Red Line serves as an extension of the Blue Line across the Minnesota River, where it connects with southern suburbs at four different stations. The BRT Orange Line connects downtown Minneapolis with Burnsville along I-35W. The arterial BRT A and C lines serve as upgrades to existing local bus routes and connect with the Blue and Green lines at certain shared stations.

 METRO

  Blue Line LRT: Target Field Station – Minneapolis-St. Paul International Airport – Mall of America
  Green Line LRT: Target Field Station – University of Minnesota – Union Depot
  Orange Line BRT: Downtown Minneapolis – Burnsville Heart of the City
  Red Line BRT: Mall of America – Apple Valley Transit Station
  A Line BRT: 46th Street station – Rosedale Transit Center
  C Line BRT: Downtown Minneapolis – Brooklyn Center Transit Center

A variety of rail services are being pondered by state and local governments, including neighborhood streetcar systems, intercity light rail service, and commuter rail options to exurban regions. Minnesota is one of several Midwestern states considering high-speed rail service, using Chicago as a regional hub.

The Minneapolis–Saint Paul area has been criticized for inadequate public transportation. Its public transportation system is less robust than those of many other cities its size. As the metro area has grown, the roads and highways have been updated and widened, but traffic volume is growing faster than the projects needed to widen them, and public transportation has not expanded commensurate with the population. Minneapolis–Saint Paul is ranked the fifth-worst for congestion growth of similar-sized U.S. metro areas. Additional lines and spurs are needed to upgrade public transportation in the Twin Cities. Construction is underway for Green Line extension connecting downtown Minneapolis to the southwest suburb of Eden Prairie. A northwest LRT (Blue Line extension) along Bottineau Boulevard is being planned from downtown Minneapolis to Brooklyn Park. The METRO Orange Line BRT will eventually be extended to Lakeville. The METRO Gold Line BRT is planned to connect downtown Saint Paul to the eastern suburbs within the next few years.

References

External links

 Flyby video courtesy NASA/Goddard Scientific Visualization Studio
 Fact sheet about Minneapolis–St. Paul Metropolitan Area Comparison
 History of the National Weather Service in Minneapolis–St. Paul, Minnesota
 GIS-based Demographic Guide to Twin Cities Region
 Lost Twin Cities – Documentary produced by Twin Cities Public Television

 
Minnesota populated places on the Mississippi River
Twin cities
Metropolitan areas of Minnesota
Metropolitan areas of Wisconsin
Regional rivalries